Nikolayevka is a rural locality (a village) in Krasnoplamenskoye Rural Settlement, Alexandrovsky District, Vladimir Oblast, Russia. The population was 3 as of 2010.

Geography 
The village is located 15 km south-east from Krasnoye Plamya, 16 km north-west from Alexandrov.

References 

Rural localities in Alexandrovsky District, Vladimir Oblast